Colla is a genus of moths of the family Bombycidae. The genus was erected by Francis Walker in 1865.

Selected species
Colla aerila Schaus, 1929
Colla amoena Dognin, 1923
Colla aminula Druce, 1890
Colla coelestis Schaus, 1910
Colla gaudialis Schaus, 1905
Colla glaucescens Walker, 1865
Colla jehlei Schade, 1939
Colla klagesi Warren, 1901
Colla lilacina Dognin, 1916
Colla micacea (Walker, 1865)
Colla netrix (Stoll, 1789)
Colla opalifera Dognin, 1911
Colla rhodope (Drury, 1782)
Colla similis Felder, 1868
Colla umbrata Schaus, 1905

References

Bombycidae